The Hurrian pantheon consisted of gods of varied backgrounds, some of them natively Hurrian, while others adopted from other pantheons, for example Eblaite and Mesopotamian. Like the other inhabitants of the Ancient Near East, Hurrians regarded their gods as anthropomorphic. They were usually represented in the form of statues holding the symbols associated with a specific deity. The Yazılıkaya sanctuary, which was Hittite in origin but served as a center of the practice of Hurrian religion, is considered a valuable source of information about their iconography.

Hurrians organized their gods into lists known as kaluti or into similar lexical lists as the Mesopotamians. The formal structure of the pantheon was most likely based on either Mesopotamian or Syrian theology. The status of individual deities and composition of the pantheon could vary between individual locations, but some can nonetheless be identified as "pan-Hurrian."

The following list does not include deities only attested in the two Hurrian god lists whose names are transcriptions of Mesopotamian divine names, as it is unlikely that they were actively worshiped. Identification of the Yazılıkaya reliefs used in the image column follows Piotr Taracha's analysis from the monograph Religions of Second Millennium Anatolia.

Major deities

Minor or local deities

Primordial beings and mythical antagonists

Deities assumed to have Hurrian origin

References

Bibliography

Hurrian mythology
Hurrian
Mythology-related lists